The 2017 Open Castilla y León was a professional tennis tournament played on outdoor hard courts. It was the 32nd edition, for men, and 3rd edition, for women, of the tournament and part of the 2017 ATP Challenger Tour and the 2017 ITF Women's Circuit. It took place in El Espinar, Segovia, Spain, between 31 July – 6 August 2017.

Men's singles main draw entrants

Seeds 

 1 Rankings as of 24 July 2017.

Other entrants 
The following players received wildcards into the singles main draw:
  Nicolás Álvarez Varona
  Gerard Granollers
  Carlos Taberner
  Bernabé Zapata Miralles

The following players received entry from the qualifying draw:
  Edoardo Eremin
  Hugo Grenier
  Mick Lescure
  David Vega Hernández

Women's singles main draw entrants

Seeds 

 1 Rankings as of 24 July 2017.

Other entrants 
The following player received a wildcard into the singles main draw:
  Marina Bassols Ribera
  Ángela Díez Plágaro
  Claudia Hoste Ferrer
  Vera Zvonareva

The following players received entry from the qualifying draw:
  Ainhoa Atucha Gómez
  Alba Carrillo Marín
  Rocío de la Torre Sánchez
  Marta Huqing González Encinas
  María Gutiérrez Carrasco
  Nuria Párrizas Díaz 
  Luisa Stefani
  Noelia Zeballos

Champions

Men's singles

 Jaume Munar def.  Alex De Minaur 6–3, 6–4.

Women's singles
 Paula Badosa Gibert def.  Ayla Aksu, 6–2, 6–4

Men's doubles

 Adrián Menéndez-Maceiras /  Sergiy Stakhovsky def.  Roberto Ortega Olmedo /  David Vega Hernández 4–6, 6–3, [10–7].

Women's doubles
 Quinn Gleason /  Luisa Stefani def.  Ayla Aksu /  Bibiane Schoofs, 6–3, 6–2

External links 
 Official website

2017 ITF Women's Circuit
2017 ATP Challenger Tour
2017 in Spanish tennis
July 2017 sports events in Spain
August 2017 sports events in Spain
Tennis tournaments in Spain
2017
2017 Open Castilla y León